Countship of Brahesminde (Danish: Grevskabet Brahesminde) was a Danish countship created May 9, 1798, for privy councilor and chamberlain Preben Bille-Brahe of Hvedholm, Damsbo, Stensgård and Østrupgård. The county was dissolved by abolition of the lens system (Lensafløsningen) in 1928.

Counts 

 Preben Bille-Brahe
 Henrik Bille-Brahe (1798-1875)
 Preben Charles Bille-Brahe-Selby
 Henrik Bille-Brahe-Selby
 Jon Carl Preben Bille-Brahe-Selby

Coat of arms
Coat of arms count Bille-Brahe:

"Grever af Bille-Brahe. Firdelt, 1. og 4. lodret delt af rødt og hvidt (rammerne betyder ingenting), 2. og 3. en halv liggende gul lilje i blåt; grevekronet midterskjold lodret delt af Bille og Brahe (se side 601 og 337. På hjelmene grevekrone; to vesselhorn tre gange tværdelt af vekselvis rødt og hvidt samt påfuglefjer; en kronet sort ravn med en gul ring i næbbet; som nr. 1, kun at farverne er hvidt og sort. Skjoldholdere: to vildmænd.".

Coat of arms count Bille-Brahe-Selby:

"Grever Bille-Brahe-Selby. Som for Greve af Bille-Brahe, ovenfor, dog med midterskjoldet lodret delt af Brahe og Selby (= 1. felt i våbenet for Baron Selby, se side 600) med Bille som hjerteskjold, og med Selbys hjelmfigur i midten.".

References

Danish noble titles